Warren Peter Cote (August 30, 1902 – October 17, 1987) was a pinch-hitter in Major League Baseball who appeared in two games for the  New York Giants. A native of Cambridge, Massachusetts, he batted and threw right-handed.

Cote had one at-bat without a hit and also appeared as a pinch-runner.

Cote died in Middleton, Massachusetts, at age 85.

External links
Baseball Reference

New York Giants (NL) players
Baseball players from Massachusetts
1902 births
1987 deaths